Gams bei Hieflau is a former municipality in the district of Liezen in the Austrian state of Styria. Since the 2015 Styria municipal structural reform, it is part of the municipality Landl.

Geography
Gams lies in a tributary valley of the Enns and the Salza in upper Styria. It lies in the western foothills of the Hochschwab.

References

Cities and towns in Liezen District